Soares is a common surname in the Portuguese language and Galician, namely in the Portuguese speaking world, as well as other places. It was originally a patronymic, meaning Son of Soeiro. It is equivalent to the Spanish surname Suárez. Notable people named Soares include:

People

General 
Alana Soares, American model and actress
António Soares dos Reis (1847–1889), Portuguese sculptor
Diandra Soares, Indian model, fashion designer and television host
Diogo Soares, 16th-century Portuguese navigator and explorer
Elza Soares (1930–2022), Brazilian samba singer
Emelina Soares (born 1993), Indian artist, art historian, and educator
Estevam Soares (born 1956), Brazilian football (soccer) head coach
Ilka Soares (1932–2022), Brazilian actress
Jô Soares (1938–2022), Brazilian comedian, author and talk show host
João Clemente Baena Soares (born 1931), Brazilian diplomat
Joffre Soares (1918–1996), Brazilian actor
John Soares, award-winning independent filmmaker, martial arts choreographer, actor and viral video star
Lota de Macedo Soares (1910–1967), Brazilian aesthete
Maria Barroso (Maria de Jesus Simões Barroso Soares) (1925–2015), Portuguese public figure
Oscar Niemeyer Soares Filho (1907–2012), Brazilian architect
Rodrigo R. Soares, Brazilian economist
Romildo Ribeiro Soares (born 1947), Brazilian televangelist and missionary
Tynisha Keli (Tynisha Keli Soares) (born 1985), American R&B-pop singer
Ulisses Soares (born 1958), Brazilian religious leader

Politicians 
António Pinto Soares, former Head of State of Costa Rica
António Soares Carneiro, Portuguese military officer and politician
David Soares, American politician
Delúbio Soares, Brazilian politician
João Soares, Portuguese politician
Mário Soares, (1924–2017), Portuguese politician
Mário Lino Soares Correia, Portuguese politician
Soares Sambu, politician from Guinea-Bissau

Footballers

Adilson Soares Cassamá, Bissau-Guinean footballer
Admilson Jorge Soares, known as Soares, Bissau-Guinean footballer
A. J. Soares, American soccer player
Bruna Soares (born 1985), Brazilian women's footballer
Cédric Soares, Portuguese footballer
Clemerson de Araújo Soares, Brazilian footballer
Ernesto da Conceição Soares, Cape Verdian footballer
Fabiano Vieira Soares, Brazilian footballer
Felipe Soares, Brazilian footballer
Geilson de Carvalho Soares, Brazilian footballer
Hermes Neves Soares, Brazilian footballer
Hiziel Souza Soares, known as Soares, Brazilian footballer
Irenio Soares, Brazilian footballer
Ivanildo Soares Cassamá, Portuguese footballer
João Soares da Mota Neto, Brazilian footballer
José Manuel Soares "Pepe", Portuguese footballer
Júlio César Soares Espíndola, Brazilian footballer
Louie Soares, English footballer
Luís Carlos Almada Soares (born 1986), Cape Verdean footballer
Mario Soares (footballer)
Nuno Miguel Soares Pereira Ribeiro, Portuguese footballer
Paulo Jorge Soares Gomes, Portuguese footballer
Paulo Jorge Sousa Gomes, Portuguese footballer
Renan Brito Soares, Brazilian footballer
Rodolfo Santos Soares, Brazilian footballer
Ronaldo Soares Giovanelli, Brazilian footballer
Tom Soares, English footballer

Other sports related

Bruno Soares, Brazilian professional tennis player
Filipe Soares Franco, Portuguese chairman of the football club Sporting Club de Portugal
Joe Soares, American wheelchair rugby player
Josh Soares, Canadian professional ice hockey player
Luis Soares, Portuguese-French long-distance runner
Rui Soares (born 1993), Portuguese squash player
Tim Soares (born 1997), American-Brazilian basketball player for Ironi Ness Ziona of the Israeli Basketball Premier League
Togo Renan Soares, Brazilian basketball coach

Other
National Museum Soares dos Reis, Portuguese museum

Portuguese-language surnames
Patronymic surnames
Surnames from given names